Liam Craig Gordon (born 26 January 1996) is a Scottish professional footballer who plays as a defender for Scottish Premiership club St Johnstone.

Career
Gordon played for Dundee and Raith Rovers at youth level before John McGlynn took him to Hearts on a three-year contract, spending six months on loan at Arbroath during the 2014–15 season in the process.

He signed for his boyhood heroes St Johnstone in 2015, moving on loan to Elgin City shortly afterwards. He made his debut for St Johnstone in May 2016, starting in a 2–2 draw against Hearts.

In January 2017, Gordon, along with fellow Saints defender Aaron Comrie, moved on loan to Scottish League One side Peterhead until the end of the 2016–17 season.

In July 2019, Gordon was ruled out for up to six weeks after he fractured his elbow in training. on 6 December 2020, he captained St Johnstone for the first time, in a 1–1 draw away to Celtic.

Career statistics

Honours
St Johnstone
Scottish Cup: 2020–21
Scottish League Cup: 2020–21

References

External links

1996 births
Living people
Footballers from Perth, Scotland
Scottish footballers
Association football defenders
Dundee F.C. players
Raith Rovers F.C. players
Heart of Midlothian F.C. players
Arbroath F.C. players
St Johnstone F.C. players
Elgin City F.C. players
Peterhead F.C. players
Scottish Professional Football League players